North Heidelberg is an unincorporated community in Berks County, Pennsylvania, United States. It is located at the junction of Mill and Charming Forge Roads. The township building of North Heidelberg Township is located here.

Unincorporated communities in Berks County, Pennsylvania
Unincorporated communities in Pennsylvania